Antonie Jaeckel (5 September 1876 – 26 December 1960) was a German actress.

Selected filmography
 Madeleine (1919)
 Fridericus Rex (1922)
 The Unknown Tomorrow (1923)
 Cock of the Roost (1925)
 If Only It Weren't Love (1925)
 Love's Joys and Woes (1926)
 That Was Heidelberg on Summer Nights (1927)
 Queen Louise (1927–28)
 Lord of the Night (1927)
 Potsdam (1927)
 Regine (1927)
 The Harbour Baron (1928)
 Give Me Life (1928)
 Strauss Is Playing Today (1928)
  Painted Youth (1929)
 Fräulein Else (1929)
 We Stick Together Through Thick and Thin (1929)
 Delicatessen (1930)
 The Squeaker (1931)
 Three from the Unemployment Office (1932)
 The Mad Bomberg (1932)
 Little Dorrit (1934)
 Love Conquers All (1934)
 The Sporck Battalion (1934)
 Mazurka (1935)
 Make Me Happy (1935)
 The King's Prisoner (1935)
  She and the Three (1935)
 The Night With the Emperor (1936)
 Der Mustergatte (1937)
 The Divine Jetta (1937)
 Love Can Lie (1937)
 Dangerous Game (1937)
 The Blue Fox (1938)
 Congo Express (1939)
 Bachelor's Paradise (1939)
 Wedding in Barenhof (1942)
 No Place for Love (1947)
 Martina (1949)
 Don't Dream, Annette (1949)
 It Happened Only Once (1958)

Bibliography
 Kulik, Karol. Alexander Korda: The Man Who Could Work Miracles. Virgin Books, 1990.

External links

1876 births
1960 deaths
German film actresses
German silent film actresses
Actresses from Berlin
20th-century German actresses